CETIQT (Centro de Tecnologia da Indústria Química e Têxtil) is a professional school and a center for professional development to the textile industry in Brazil.  It has two campuses located in Rio de Janeiro, the Riachuelo Campus in Riachuelo neighborhood, and the Barra Campus or Centro Empresarial Mario Henrique Simonsen in Barra da Tijuca borough.

CETIQT is one of the school units of SENAI (Serviço Nacional de Aprendizagem Industrial), a network of not-for-profit secondary level professional schools established and maintained by the Brazilian Confederation of Industry.

External links
 

Engineering universities and colleges in Brazil
Schools in Rio de Janeiro (city)